The First United Methodist Church of Glendale, formerly known as the First Methodist Episcopal Church of Glendale in historical documents, is a United Methodist church located at 7102 N. 58th Dr. in downtown Glendale, Arizona, and was built during 1928–29.  Its sanctuary, with its linked administration wing, was listed on the National Register of Historic Places in 2006 for its architecture.

It is an east-facing Gothic Revival style church with a projected entryway through a Gothic arch.  A castellated bell tower rises on its north side.  It is connected to the south to a previously-built brick administration wing (1923) by an enclosed porch and a loggia. Its exterior walls are brick, with occasional clinker brick accents, and it has cast stone details.

The sanctuary was designed by Los Angeles architectural firm G.A. Faithful and L.B. Baker.  It was built by local contractor W.M. Mullen "with ample labor provided by church volunteers."

The church had previously begun building a different, "elaborate" Gothic Revival sanctuary, designed by local architect M.L. Fitzhugh, but this proved too expensive to complete.  The effort was abandoned, and then the work was renovated to provide administrative offices, creating what is now the administration wing.

The sanctuary and administration building combination was listed as First Methodist Episcopal Church of Glendale Sanctuary on the National Register.  Other buildings on the property include classrooms, a Fellowship Hall, and utility buildings, none of which are included in the NRHP listing.

Notes

References

External links
 

Glendale FirstMethodist
Glendale FirstMethodist
Glendale FirstMethodist
Glendale FirstMethodist
National Register of Historic Places in Maricopa County, Arizona
Methodist Episcopal churches in the United States